William Richard Parkins (20 August 1925 – 1 November 1969) was an English cricketer. Parkins was a right-handed batsman. He was born at Glenfield, Leicestershire.

Parkins made his first-class debut for Leicestershire against Cambridge University at Fenner's in 1950. He made four further first-class appearances in 1950, the last of which came against Worcestershire in the County Championship. In his five matches, he scored 125 runs at an average of 12.50, with a high score of 39.

He died at Leicester, Leicestershire on 1 November 1969.

References

External links
William Parkins at ESPNcricinfo
William Parkins at CricketArchive

1925 births
1969 deaths
People from Glenfield, Leicestershire
Cricketers from Leicestershire
English cricketers
Leicestershire cricketers